Faruk Begolli (14 February 1944 – 23 August 2007), was a prominent Kosovo Albanian actor.

He attended high school in Pristina and graduated from the Academy of Film in Belgrade (1966). Begolli played in more than 60 films, starting with Veljko Bulajić's Pogled u zenicu Sunca (1966). He cooperated with director Puriša Đorđević in his films Podne (Noon), Jutro (The Morning), and San (The Dream), and his notable roles include Bitka na Neretvi, Čuvar plaže u zimskom periodu and Derviš i Smrt (The Dervish and Death).

In the late 1980s, Begolli returned from Belgrade to Kosovo, where he worked as a professor at the Faculty of Drama of the University of Pristina .

His last major lead role was in Ekrem Kryeziu's Dashuria e Bjeshkëve të Nemuna (The Love of the Accursed Mountains, 1997), and his work was Etjet e Kosovës (Kosovo's Thirsts, 2006), for which he co-wrote the script. One of h last film appearances was in the short 10 Minuta (2004), directed by Burim Haliti.

Begolli died in 2007 after a long battle with cancer.

His brother, Adil Begolli, was a prolific film and television producer.

Selected filmography

Pogled u zjenicu sunca (1966)
The Dream (1966) - Petar
Deca vojvode Smita (1967) - Mirko
The Morning (1967) - Rus Miska
Uka i Bjeshkëve të nemura (1968) - Partizan
Brat doktora Homera (1968) - Seljak / peasant
Podne (1968) - Rus Misko
Operacija Beograd (1968) - Jasa
Sarajevski atentat (1968) - Nedeljko Cabrinovic
Battle of Neretva (1969) - Stevo
Moja strana svijeta (1969)
Rekvijem (1970)
Draga Irena! (1970) - Misko
Prva ljubav (1970)
Si të vdiset (1972)
Walter Defends Sarajevo (1972) - Branko
SB zatvara krug (1974) - Agent Stipe
Dervis i smrt (1974) - Mula Jusuf
Crveni udar (1974) - Slikar
Pavle Pavlovic (1974) - Student preprodavac
Cuvar plaze u zimskom periodu (1976) - Draganov prijatelj
Vrhovi Zelengore (1976) - Rajko
Stici pre svitanja (1978) - Doktor
Sudbine (1978)
Zestoke godine (1978) - Aleksandar Dragovic
Lyubov i yarost (1978)
Kur pranvera vonohet (1979)
Partizanska eskadrila (1979) - Porucnik Begovic
Përroi vërshues (1981)
13. jul (1982) - Partizan Meho
Timocka buna (1983) - Potpukovnik
Dih (1983) - Djordje
Idi mi, dodji mi (1983) - Marijin kolega I
Mahovina na asfaltu (1983)
Opasni trag (1984) - Inspektor Ramiz
Proka (1985)
Kuca pored pruge (1988) - Hasan
Azra (1988) - Osman
The Legendary Life of Ernest Hemingway (1989)
Noc u kuci moje majke (1991) - Kum Radovan
Srcna dama (1991) - Azem
Cartier Project (1991) - Selim
Bulevar revolucije (1992) - Clan komisije na ispitu
10 Minuta (2004), directed by Burim Haliti
Etjet e Kosovës (2006) - Old Albanian (final film role)

References
 
Preminuo Faruk Begoli bituary, Dnevnik  
Kosovo Actor Faruk Begolli Dies, Balkan Investigative Reporting Network

External links

1944 births
2007 deaths
People from Peja
Kosovan male actors
Yugoslav male film actors
Kosovo Albanians
Academic staff of the University of Pristina
Yugoslav film directors
Yugoslav Albanians